Tata Sons Pvt. Ltd. is the parent company of the Tata Group and holds the bulk of shareholding in the Tata group of companies including their land holdings across India, tea estates and steel plants. It is a privately owned conglomerate of nearly 100 companies encompassing several primary business sectors, including: chemicals, consumer products, energy, engineering, information systems, materials, and services. Its headquarters are in Mumbai.

Tata Sons was established as a trading enterprise in 1917, and engaged primarily in the lucrative opium and tea trade with Mongolia and China before moving from conducting businesses directly to becoming the principal holding company of Tata Group. About 66% of the equity capital of Tata Sons is held by philanthropic trusts endowed by members of the Tata family. The biggest two of these trusts are the Sir Dorabji Tata Trust and Sir Ratan Tata Trust. Tata Sons is the owner of the Tata name and the Tata trademarks, which are registered in India and several other countries. It is one of the largest conglomerates in the Indian subcontinent.

Location
The company is registered and located in Mumbai, India.

Board of Directors
The Tata Sons Board of Directors consists of the following:

Shareholding pattern
Sir Dorabji Tata Trust and Sir Ratan Tata Trust are the two biggest shareholders of Tata Sons, with a combined stake of around 50%, while Pallonji Shapoorji Mistry was the largest individual shareholder. Pallonji's father, Shapoorji Pallonji Mistry was a prominent construction magnate who acquired a significant stake of Tata Sons in the 1930s initially from Framroze Edulji Dinshaw, and finally when JRD Tata's younger brother, Dorab, sold his shares in a fit of anger. Pallonji's shareholding was divided equally between his two sons, Shapoor Mistry and Cyrus Mistry, who died in September, 2022.

 Total equity shares: 404,146 (₹1,000 each)

Conversion to Private Ltd, and internal conflicts 
Natarajan Chandrasekaran took over as Chairman of Tata Sons on 21 February 2017. The company also undertook conversion from a public limited company to a private limited one in 2017; both these decisions were challenged in court by former executive chairman Cyrus Mistry.
In December 2019, NCLAT declared the conversion, and by extension, Chandrasekaran's chairmanship, illegal and restored Mistry. On 10 January 2020, however, the Supreme Court stayed NCLAT's order; in response, Mistry filed a cross appeal in the court, seeking explanations for anomalies in the NCLAT. On 26 March 2021, the Supreme Court of India upheld Tata Sons' decision to sack Cyrus Mistry.

See also 

 List of companies of India
 List of largest companies by revenue
 List of corporations by market capitalization
 Make in India
 Forbes Global 2000
 Fortune India 500
 Tata Group

References

External links
 Tata Sons' official profile
 Here's a brief history of the Tata Group's six chairmen
 Twentieth century impressions of Hongkong, Shanghai, and other treaty ports of China: their history, people, commerce, industries, and resources, Volume 1, by Arnold Wright; Lloyds Greater Britain publishing company, UK; 1908, pp. 228 & 638.

 
Holding companies of India
Holding companies established in 1917
Indian companies established in 1917